DNA-3-methyladenine glycosylase I (deoxyribonucleate 3-methyladenine glycosidase I, 3-methyladenine DNA glycosylase I, DNA-3-methyladenine glycosidase I) is an enzyme with systematic name alkylated-DNA glycohydrolase (releasing methyladenine and methylguanine). This enzyme catalyses the following chemical reaction

 Hydrolysis of alkylated DNA, releasing 3-methyladenine

This enzyme is involved in the removal of alkylated bases from DNA in Escherichia coli.

References

External links 
 

EC 3.2.2